The International Test of English Proficiency or iTEP is a language assessment tool that measures the English skills of non-native English speakers.  The test is supported by more than 700 institutions including the California State University system. The test is available in more than 40 countries, and is also used by businesses, and governments such as Saudi Arabia, Colombia, and Mexico for large-scale initiatives. There are over 600 iTEP test centers worldwide, with more than 100 in China where iTEP has partnerships with some of the largest education companies in the country.

iTEP International was co-founded by former ELS Language Centers President Perry Akins and business partner Sharif Ossayran. The test was first launched in 2008 for colleges, universities, and international programs. Versions for secondary schools and business use were soon added, followed by English tests for specific industries such as hospitality and au pair.

Education Applications

There are three iTEP exams for use in educational settings: 

iTEP Academic is used on-site by intensive English programs (IEPs) for placement, progress, and exit evaluation. It is also used by colleges and universities for admissions purposes.

iTEP SLATE evaluates high school, secondary school, and middle school students, and is used by boarding schools and academies. Between June 2012 and June 2013, the number of US institutions recognizing this test quadrupled and the number continues to grow through 2017. This growth is largely due to the retirement of ETS's SLEP exam and the limited availability of their TOEFL Junior test.

iTEP Placement is designed for the prompt turnaround of placement testing in English programs. It assesses grammar, listening, vocabulary, and reading in addition to writing prompts that can be graded by the administering institution.

iTEP Academic and SLATE each have a "core" version and a "plus" version. The "core" versions are Internet-based, last 60 minutes, and test reading, grammar and listening. The "plus" versions last 90 minutes in total and also test writing and speaking, requiring the test taker to submit writing and speaking samples via computer. Results are available instantly on the multiple-choice "core" sections, and the speaking and writing results are graded by ESL-trained native English speakers in 5 business days (or 24 hours for IEPs). The "plus" exams retail for $119USD and can be scheduled within 3 days, making iTEP one of the most flexible and least expensive options among its competitors, which include TOEFL and IELTS. Institutions administering iTEP exams on-site receive discounted rates. iTEP also creates customized or white label tests for educational institutions.

Business Applications

iTEP offers general iTEP Business and iTEP Conversation exams, as well as specialized English exams for specific industries.

iTEP Business measures the English skills needed for a work environment. It is used by companies to screen new hires, make decisions about promotions and assignments, and evaluate English training programs. Like iTEP Academic and iTEP SLATE, iTEP Business has a core and plus version.

iTEP Conversation assesses an individual's ability to speak and understand English within 30 minutes. The exam is designed to put the test-taker at ease using a conversational, friendly context. This exam is also used in academic settings. 

iTEP Hospitality measures the English skills necessary to work at restaurants, hotels, resorts, and cruise lines that serve English speakers. The test lasts 30 minutes and evaluates speaking and listening. It is typically administered onsite by an employer for hiring and promotional decisions.

iTEP Au Pair evaluates the English abilities of foreign applicants to au pair programs in the US. Like iTEP Hospitality, it assesses speaking and listening skills in 30 minutes using industry specific content.

iTEP Intern is used by agencies that process J-1 visa applicants who wish to come from abroad to work as interns with US companies. This exam lasts 30 minutes and assesses listening and speaking skills using workplace contexts.

Scoring

iTEP scores individuals on a scale of 0-6 (at 0.5 intervals) for each section of the test as well as an overall score. Each level translates to CEFR levels and an equivalent range of scores on other language proficiency exams.

Test Preparation

In 2014, iTEP released the Official iTEP Preparation Guide, printing an updated edition in 2015. The Prep Guide consists of a 133-page printed book intended to familiarize test-takers with the format of the tests, and two practice tests, one to be taken before reading the book as a diagnostic, and another to be taken at the end as a comparison. The writing and speaking portions of the test are self-graded to help test-takers grasp the criteria that will be used to evaluate their work. The Prep Guide is sold online for about $27USD. An edition for the Chinese market was published by Beijing Foreign Studies University-based Foreign Language Teaching and Research Press in 2016 and retails for ¥88.

External links
 Official iTEP site
 Official iTEP Preparation Guide on Amazon
 Video about iTEP

References

  English language tests